Dariyapur is a village situated in the heart of Nalanda district in Bihar state, India. It is 9 km far from its local market Hilsa which is its subdivision also. Lohanda is the nearest railway halt from here.

Introduction

Agriculture, commerce and services are the main employment sources in the village. The main crops are paddy, wheat, corn and some rabi crops.

The name of this village "dariyapur" is made of two words "dariya" & "pur" means village of rivers. There are three local rivers named: Dorwa, Jankariya and Sindh merge in the western side of this village. The village is situated in the Hilsa subdivision and the Kachhiyawan panchayat. The police station is in Nagarnausa, and the local post office is in Kachhiyawan.

Nearby villages include Barabigha, Bhobhi, kachhiyawan and Bhudkur. This village has a great history. And its countrymen are very kindhearted as well as industrious. Thus its versatile development is going on. Now, signs of development are visible such as government school, electricity, water supply, double-lane solid roads, and Internet availability.

References

Villages in Nalanda district